A suicide bomber detonated himself near security personal vehicles close to a polio centre in a town near Quetta, Pakistan, killing at least 15 people, including 13 policemen and one soldier and wounding another 25, including 18 policemen, two soldiers and six civilians. Both Tehrik-i-Taliban Pakistan and Jaishul Islam organizations claimed responsibility.

See also
 8 August 2013 Quetta bombing
 August 2016 Quetta bombing
 April 2019 Quetta attack

References

Suicide bombings in 2016
21st-century mass murder in Pakistan
Terrorist incidents in Quetta
January 2016 crimes in Asia
Mass murder in 2016
Mass murder in Pakistan
Terrorist incidents in Pakistan in 2016
2016 murders in Pakistan
Suicide bombings in Quetta